Chavika Watrsang (born October 8, 1995) is a Thai beauty pageant titleholder who was appointed as Miss Earth Thailand 2015 and Thailand's representative in Miss Earth 2015. She is best known as the Miss Universe Thailand 2015 1st Runner-Up to Aniporn Chalermburanawong.

Chavika is the first representative from Miss Universe Thailand since 2012 when Waratthaya Wongchayaporn was sent to compete.

Pageantry

Miss Universe Thailand 2015
Chavika joined 39 other women to compete at the Miss Universe Thailand pageant in 2015. She was heavily favored to win the crown but as the pageant concluded, Chavika was hailed as the first runner up, losing to Aniporn Chalermburanawong. The pageant was held at Royal Paragon Hall, Siam Paragon in Bangkok on 18 July 2015.

On 11 September 2015, the Miss Universe Thailand Organization announced through their official Facebook fan page that Chavika is the Miss Thailand 2015 for Miss Earth which is hosted by Austria.

Miss Earth 2015
Being appointed as Miss Earth Thailand for 2015, Chavika is Thailand's representative to be Miss Earth 2015 and would try to succeed Jamie Herrell as the next Miss Earth. She did not place into Top 16.

References

1995 births
Living people
Miss Earth 2015 contestants
Chavika Watrsang
Chavika Watrsang
Miss Earth Thailand